The Gen. Robert Bullock House is a historic house located at the junction of Southeast 119th Court and Southeast 128 Place in Oklawaha, Florida.

Description and history 
The house was added to the National Register of Historic Places on July 13, 1993.

References

External links
 Marion County listings at National Register of Historic Places
 Marion County listings at Florida's Office of Cultural and Historical Programs

Houses on the National Register of Historic Places in Florida
National Register of Historic Places in Marion County, Florida
Houses in Marion County, Florida
Folk Victorian architecture in the United States
Vernacular architecture in Florida
Houses completed in 1885